The St. Anne's Cathedral  also called Debrecen Cathedral It is a Catholic religious building that since 1993 works as the cathedral of the Diocese of Debrecen-Nyíregyháza, is located in the city of Debrecen, Hungary.

The baroque church was built in 1721, commissioned by Cardinal Imre Csáky, by the Milanese architect Giovanni Battista Carlone and dedicated to St. Anne in 1746. In 1811 the church tower was damaged by fire in 1834 and were built the two towers projected by Ferenc Povolny. In 1928 new entrances were added and restoration works were being renovated entrance with the creation of a wide staircase, and the three statues on the facade dedicated to St. Emeric of Hungary, St. Stephen and the Virgin and Child Jesus.

See also
Roman Catholicism in Hungary
List of cathedrals in Hungary
St. Anne

References

Roman Catholic cathedrals in Hungary
Buildings and structures in Debrecen
Roman Catholic churches completed in 1721
1721 establishments in the Habsburg monarchy
18th-century establishments in Hungary
18th-century Roman Catholic church buildings in Hungary